The 2012–13 Fordham Rams men's basketball team represented Fordham University during the 2012–13 NCAA Division I men's basketball season. The team was coached by Tom Pecora in his third year at the school. Fordham Rams home games were played at Rose Hill Gymnasium and the team was a member of the Atlantic 10 Conference. They finished the season 7–24, 3–13 in A-10 play to finish in a tie for 14th place. They failed to qualify for the Atlantic 10 tournament.

Roster

Schedule and results

|-
!colspan=9| Regular season

References

Fordham
Fordham Rams men's basketball seasons